Barbpdes joaquinae is a species of freshwater ray-finned fish from the carp and minnow family, Cyprinidae. It is endemic to Lanao del Sur on Mindanao in the Philippines where it occurs in a single small stream draining from Basak Lake into the  Agus River.

References

Barbodes
Freshwater fish of the Philippines
Fish described in 1968
Endemic fauna of the Philippines
Fauna of Mindanao